266 Squadron may refer to:

 No. 266 Squadron RAF of Britain's Royal Air Force 
 Marine Medium Tiltrotor Squadron 266 of the US Marine Corps